Charnette Fair (born June 29, 1979) is a retired American female volleyball player. She was part of the United States women's national volleyball team.

She participated at the 2007 Pan American Games.

References

External links
http://www.gophersports.com/sports/w-volley/spec-rel/041107aaa.html

1979 births
Living people
American women's volleyball players
Place of birth missing (living people)
Volleyball players at the 2007 Pan American Games
Pan American Games medalists in volleyball
Pan American Games bronze medalists for the United States
Medalists at the 2007 Pan American Games
Minnesota Golden Gophers women's volleyball players
21st-century American women